Annita van Doorn (born 26 April 1983) is a Dutch Short track speed skater. She made her international debut in 2003 at the World Championships for teams. Van Doorn was the first Dutch short track speed skater with a victory on a World Cup distance. She took a lap on her competitors on the 3000 meters and won the super final, surprisingly, at her second World Cup competition. In 2008, she became European Champion in the 500 meters in Ventspils, Latvia. In the overall classification she ended as 5th. She won bronze medals at the European Championships with the relay team in 2007, 2009 en 2010. In 2009 Van Doorn won her first Dutch title.

At the Olympic Games in Vancouver, Van Doorn ended as fourth on the relay with her team, together with teammates Liesbeth Mau Asam, Jorien ter Mors, Sanne van Kerkhof and Maaike Vos. Van Doorn ended as 11th at the 1000 meters. She was close for qualifying for the 2006 Olympics in Torino, but did not make it.

The 2010-2011 season was successful for Van Doorn and the relay team. During the European Championships in their own country (Thialf, Heerenveen) the Dutch (Jorien ter Mors, Sanne van Kerkhof, Yara van Kerkhof and Annita van Doorn) grabbed the European title. Two months later the team surprised at the Worldchampionships. Behind China, the Dutch team took the silver. Earlier in the season the team won bronze at a World Cup competition in Changchun, China. It was the first medal in 8 years for the Netherlands in a World Cup competition.

Van Doorn won the award for the best short track speed skater of the Netherlands twice (2008, 2009).

Personal records

*: Dutch national record

References

External links
 Website Annita van Doorn
 

1983 births
Living people
Dutch female short track speed skaters
Olympic short track speed skaters of the Netherlands
Short track speed skaters at the 2010 Winter Olympics
Sportspeople from Utrecht (city)
21st-century Dutch women